Unfinished Business is a British sitcom written by Laurence Marks and Maurice Gran which ran for two series between 24 January 1998 and 14 February 1999 on BBC One. It stars Harriet Walter as Amy, Henry Goodman as Spike and Jaye Griffiths as Tania.

Episode guide

Series 1: 1998

Series 2: 1999

References

External links
 
 

1998 British television series debuts
1999 British television series endings
1990s British sitcoms
BBC television sitcoms
English-language television shows
Television series by Fremantle (company)
Television shows set in London